Admiral George Ourry Lempriere (1787-1864) was an officer in the British Royal Navy during the Napoleonic Wars that rose to the rank of Admiral.

Life 
George O. Lempriere was born in 1787 to Colonel Thomas Lempriere, Seigneur of Chesnel, and Elizabeth Beuzeville, of Jersey. His father was wounded at the Battle of Jersey.

Career 
Lempriere joined the navy in 1797, were he would serve under Lord Nelson at the Battle of Copenhagen in 1801. In 1807 he would receive his commission as a lieutenant. In 1810 Lempriere serve under Sir Alexander Cochrane in the Invasion of Guadeloupe (1810) part of the Napoleonic Wars. In 1811 Lempriere was moved to the HMS Africa under the command of Sir Herbert Sawyer, the Africa would join part of Broke's squadron during the War of 1812 where they would capture multiple ships. He was promoted Commander in 1813 and from 1813 to 1815, Lempriere was in command of the HMS Trent which served as a Hospital Ship.

Admiral Sir Herbert Sawyer, who was the Commander-in-Chief, Cork would appoint George Lempriere as his Flag-Captain. Lempriere was placed on the retired list but would continue to receive the following promotions, Rear-Admiral in 1854, Vice-Admiral in 1858, and Admiral 3 December 1863 shortly before his death.

Family 
Lempriere would marry Frances Dumaresq, daughter of William Dumaresq Esq. and Charlotte Dumaresq, thus a granddaughter of Admiral Thomas Dumaresq. They would have Issue.

 Captain Audley Lempriere (1834–1855) killed in the Crimean War outside Sebastopol during an attack on the Russian rifle pit.
 Captain Algernon Thomas Lempriere (1835–1874)
 Ellen Lempriere (1838–1908)
 Harriet Lempriere  (1843–1901)

References 

1787 births
1864 deaths
Royal Navy admirals
Royal Navy personnel of the Napoleonic Wars
Royal Navy personnel of the French Revolutionary Wars
Jersey people
Royal Navy personnel of the War of 1812